The Eparchy of Šabac ( or ) is an ecclesiastical territory or eparchy of the Serbian Orthodox Church in Serbia. It is situated in the north-western part of Šumadija and Western Serbia and in the small south-western part of the autonomous province of Vojvodina. It includes the geographical region of Mačva, part of Podrinje, and part of Posavina. Seat of the eparchy is in Šabac.

History
In the 18th century, the area was part of the Eparchy of Valjevo. In the end of that century, the seat of the eparchy was moved from Valjevo to Šabac. In 1831, the large Eparchy of Valjevo was divided into 3 separate eparchies: the Eparchy of Valjevo (which was renamed to the Eparchy of Šabac), the Eparchy of Užice, and the Eparchy of Zvornik. 

For a short time (from 1886 to 1898), the Eparchy of Šabac was abolished and was included into the Metropolitanate of Belgrade. In 1947, the eparchy was renamed to Eparchy of Šabac and Valjevo and its seat was in Valjevo. In 2006, the Eparchy of Šabac and Valjevo was divided into two separate eparchies: the Eparchy of Šabac and the Eparchy of Valjevo. After this division, the last bishop of the Eparchy of Šabac and Valjevo, Lavrentije, became the bishop of the new Eparchy of Šabac.

Monasteries
There are 8 monasteries that belonging to the eparchy: Ilinje, Kaona, Petkovica, Radovašnica, Čitluk, Čokešina, Soko, and Tronoša.

See also
Serbian Orthodox Church
List of the Eparchies of the Serbian Orthodox Church
Religion in Serbia
Religion in Vojvodina

Sources

External links
 
 Map of the Eparchy

Šabac
Šabac
Šabac
Mačva
Culture in Šabac